Lionel Raleigh Holland (22 March 1865 – 25 May 1936) was a British politician, the youngest son of Henry Holland, 1st Viscount Knutsford. He was elected as a Conservative Member of Parliament for Bow and Bromley in 1895. He resigned in 1899 by becoming Steward of the Manor of Northstead.

Represented Westminster on the London County Council 1895–8.

References

External links 
 

1865 births
1936 deaths
Conservative Party (UK) MPs for English constituencies
UK MPs 1895–1900
Younger sons of viscounts
Members of London County Council